Kentucky Route 16 (KY 16) is a  state highway in the U.S. state of Kentucky. It follows a southwest–northeast course, paralleling Interstate 71 from U.S. Highway 127 at Glencoe northeast to Walton and continuing northeast and north into Covington, where it ends at KY 17.

Major intersections

References

0016